Thomas Cahey (April 13, 1870 – January 5, 1935) was a United States Navy sailor and a recipient of the United States military's highest decoration, the Medal of Honor.

Born in Belfast, Ireland, on April 13, 1870, Cahey immigrated to the United States and joined the U.S. Navy from New York. On that day, he helped rescue several crewmates during a fire on the ship. For these actions, he was awarded the Medal of Honor a year later, on March 22, 1902.

Cahey's official Medal of Honor citation reads:
On board the U.S.S. Petrel for heroism and gallantry, fearlessly exposing his own life to danger in saving others on the occasion of the fire on board that vessel, 31 March 1901.

Cahey reached the rank of chief gunner's mate before leaving the Navy. He died at age 64 and was buried at Arlington National Cemetery in Arlington County, Virginia.

See also

List of Medal of Honor recipients

References

1870 births
1935 deaths
Military personnel from Belfast
Irish emigrants to the United States (before 1923)
United States Navy chiefs
United States Navy Medal of Honor recipients
Irish-born Medal of Honor recipients
Burials at Arlington National Cemetery
People from County Antrim
19th-century Irish people
Irish sailors in the United States Navy
Non-combat recipients of the Medal of Honor